Dance with the Devil may refer to:

 Dance with the Devil (film) or Perdita Durango, a 1997 Spanish film
 "Dance with the Devil" (instrumental), a 1973 solo drum instrumental by Cozy Powell
 "Dance with the Devil", an instrumental by UB40 from UB40
 "Dance with the Devil", a song by Breaking Benjamin from Phobia
 "Dance with the Devil", a song by Immortal Technique from Revolutionary Vol. 1
 "Dance with the Devil", a song by The Sounds from Something to Die For
 "Dance with the Devil", a song by Katy Perry from Witness
 "Dance with the Devil", the book written by David Bagby which includes the experience of the murder of Zachary Turner.
 "Dance with the Devil", a 2020 album by Burning Witches
 "Dance with the Devil", a 2001 song by Immortal Technique

See also 
 Dancing with the Devil (disambiguation)
 Dance with Devils, a 2015 Japanese anime television series